Annemarie Leibbrand-Wettley (12 June 1913 – 1996) was a German medical historian. She wrote her medical dissertation in 1939 and a doctoral dissertation in the 1950s. Between 1955 and 1973 she and Werner Leibbrand regularly taught at Sorbonne in Paris.  She married Werner Leibbrand 1962 with whom she also co-authored several major works.

Works

 

 

 

 Wettley, Annemarie: Vertauschbares Dasein. Heidelberg: Lambert Schneider 1947

Sources

 

 

1913 births
1996 deaths
Academic staff of the University of Paris
20th-century German historians
Academic staff of Paris-Sorbonne University
German women historians
20th-century German women writers
German expatriates in France